Jane Winstone (1912–1944) was a New Zealand aviator. She was born in Whanganui, New Zealand in 1912.

Life and career
Born in Whanganui, New Zealand on 24 September 1912, Jane Winstone was a daughter of chemist Arthur Winstone. Reared and educated in Whanganui, she attended the Sacred Heart school there, and learned to fly while still a student. At one time the youngest female solo pilot in New Zealand, Winstone first obtained her pilot's license at the age of 16.

A charter member of the Whanganui Aero Club, she also was one of those aboard the first flight from Whanganui's airport. After flying in Charles Kingsford Smith's Southern Cross, she became one of four female pilots to fly with New Zealand aviatrix Jean Batten in 1934.

Winstone applied to be a pilot for the ATA while living in New Zealand and they informed her she would be considered if she was able to be examined in Britain. She paid for her own passage to Britain to be able to sit the examination and flying test and passed with excellence. Once enlisted she was assigned to Ferry Service and flew Hurricanes and Spitfires to deliver them to pilots on bases.

Achieving the rank of lieutenant with the Royal Air Force, Air Transport Auxiliary, 12 Ferry Pool, she died in service on 10 February 1944 while flying for the Air Transport Auxiliary when her Spitfires's Merlin engine failed. Her fiancé, Angus Carr MacKenzie, who was a RNZAF officer, had died two years earlier on air operations.

Honors and legacy
In 2006, a retirement village built on St. John's Hill in Whanganui was named in Winstone's honor; it is called Jane Winstone Retirement Village.

References

1912 births
1944 deaths
New Zealand aviators
Women aviators
Air Transport Auxiliary pilots
People from Whanganui
Aviators killed in aviation accidents or incidents in the United Kingdom
British civilians killed in World War II
New Zealand military personnel killed in World War II
Victims of aviation accidents or incidents in 1944
Aviators killed in aviation accidents or incidents in England